László Kozma (born 1 May 1903, date of death unknown) was a Hungarian rower. He competed in the men's single sculls event at the 1936 Summer Olympics.

References

1903 births
Year of death missing
Hungarian male rowers
Olympic rowers of Hungary
Rowers at the 1936 Summer Olympics
Place of birth missing